David Breen (born 20 September 1985) is an Irish hurler who played centre-forward and was the captain of the Limerick senior team.

Breen made his first appearance for the team during the 2009 championship and has become a regular member of the starting fifteen over the last few seasons. Since then he has won one National Hurling League (Division 2) winners' medal.

At club level, Breen has won both Munster and county championship winners' medals with Na Piarsaigh.

Playing career

Club

Breen plays his club hurling with the Na Piarsaigh club in Limerick. After developing his hurling at juvenile levels he later came to prominence as a member of the club's minor hurling team.  He enjoyed little success in this grade, however, he later joined the Na Piarsaigh under-21 team. He won a county under-21 championship title in this grade in 2004 following a defeat of Doon.

By this stage Breen had joined the club's senior hurling team. He won a county senior championship winners' medal in 2011 following a 2-18 to 0-13 defeat of Ahane. It was Na Piarsaigh's first ever championship title. Breen later won a Munster club winners' medal following a 1-13 to 0-9 victory over Crusheen in a replay.

Honours

Club
 Limerick Senior Hurling Championship (5): 2011, 2013, 2015, 2017, 2018
 Munster Senior Club Hurling Championship (4): 2011, 2013, 2015,2017
 All-Ireland Senior Club Hurling Championship (1): 2016
 Limerick Under-21 Hurling Championship (1): 2004

Inter-county

 National Hurling League (Division 2) (1): 2011
 Munster Senior Hurling Championship (1): 2013

References

 

1985 births
Living people
Na Piarsaigh (Limerick) hurlers
Limerick inter-county hurlers
People educated at Ardscoil Rís, Limerick